Matthew A. Bross (December 7, 1903 – February 8, 1989) was an American football back for the Los Angeles Wildcats of the American Football League (AFL) and the Green Bay Packers of the National Football League (NFL). He played college football for Gonzaga.

Biography
Bross was born on December 7, 1904 in Great Falls, Montana.

Career
Bross played at the collegiate level at Gonzaga University. Following his graduation, he played professionally with Ernie Nevers Traveling Circus, a organization that involved two football teams which traveled throughout the South. The following year, Bross played with the Green Bay Packers during the 1927 NFL season. Previously he had played with the Los Angeles Wildcats of the American Football League.

See also
List of Green Bay Packers players
List of Los Angeles Wildcats players

References

External links
Matt Bross Stats at Pro-Football-Reference.com

1903 births
1989 deaths
American football running backs
Green Bay Packers players
Gonzaga Bulldogs football players
Los Angeles Wildcats players
Sportspeople from Great Falls, Montana
Players of American football from Montana